John Eddie Demarie (August 28, 1945 – November 29, 2015) was a professional American football player who played in 10 National Football League (NFL) seasons from 1967 to 1976 for the Cleveland Browns and the Seattle Seahawks.

References

1945 births
2015 deaths
American football offensive linemen
LSU Tigers football players
Cleveland Browns players
Seattle Seahawks players